Diego Pellegrini (born 21 November 1970 in Latina) is a retired Italian footballer who played as a midfielder. He last played for the Adelaide Blue Eagles in the FFSA Super League.

References 

1970 births
Living people
Italian footballers
Italy under-21 international footballers
Association football midfielders
Serie A players
Serie B players
Empoli F.C. players
L.R. Vicenza players
Parma Calcio 1913 players
A.C. Ancona players
A.C. Perugia Calcio players
Mantova 1911 players
National Soccer League (Australia) players
FFSA Super League players
Adelaide City FC players
Expatriate soccer players in Australia